Keith Dewhurst (born 24 December 1931) is an English playwright and film and television scriptwriter.

Life
Born in Oldham, Keith Dewhurst was educated at Rydal School and Peterhouse, Cambridge, graduating with a B.A. in English in 1953. After working as a yarn tester for Lancashire Cotton Corporation, he worked for the Manchester Evening Chronicle from 1955 to 1959, as their reporter on Manchester United.

Dewhurst has written television plays since 1960, and plays for the theatre since the late 1960s. He has also written radio plays and a couple of novels. His non-fiction Underdogs (2012) tells the story of Darwen FC's long run in the 1879 F.A. Cup.

Works

Plays
 Running Milligan. Televised 1965. Published in Michael Marland, ed., Z Cars: Four Scripts from the Television Series, 1968.
 Rafferty's Chant. Produced at the Mermaid Theatre, 1967. Published in Plays of the Year33, 1967.
 Corunna!. Produced 1971.
 Kidnapped, adaptation of the novel by Robert Louis Stevenson. Produced 1972.
 The Bomb in Brewery Street. Produced 1975.
 Lark Rise, adaptation of works by Flora Thompson. Produced 1978.
 Candleford, adaptation of works by Flora Thompson. Produced 1979.
 Don Quixote, adaptation of the novel by Miguel de Cervantes. Produced 1982.
 The Animals of Farthing Wood, adaptation of the Colin Dann novel.

Television plays
 Albert Hope, 1962
 The Siege of Manchester, 1965
 Men of Iron, 1969
 It Calls for a Great Deal of Love, 1969
 Lloyd-George, 1973
 Our Terry, 1975

Non-fiction
 Underdogs: the unlikely story of football's first FA Cup heroes, Yellow Press, 2012.

References

External links
 
 Keith Dewhurst at www.doollee.com
 Keith Dewhurst Biography (1931-) at www.film.reference.com

1931 births
Living people
English dramatists and playwrights
English sportswriters
English male dramatists and playwrights
English male non-fiction writers